The High Energy Photon Source (HEPS) is a diffraction-limited storage ring synchrotron light source producing hard x-ray radiations for scientific applications that will be built in the Huairou District in suburban Beijing, with estimated completion in 2025.

See also 
Beijing Synchrotron Radiation Facility  (BSRF, in Beijing, China)
Shanghai Synchrotron Radiation Facility (SSRF, in Shanghai, China)
National Synchrotron Radiation Laboratory (NSRL, in Hefei, China)
Dalian Coherent Light Source (DCLS, VUV FEL in Dalian, China)
Soft X-ray Free Electron Laser (SXFEL, in Shanghai, China)
List of synchrotron radiation facilities

Notes

References 
Groundbreaking Ceremony at the High Energy Photon Source in Beijing, Synchrotron Radiation News, 32:5, 40-40 (2019)
"China opens unique free electron laser facility", Science (January 2017)
Zhao, Zhentang et al. "SXFEL: A Soft X-ray Free Electron Laser in China", Synchrotron Radiation News Volume 30, 2017 - Issue 6

Light sources